War Dragons is a real-time strategy mobile game, developed and published by Pocket Gems.

Gameplay
War Dragons is a real-time strategy game. The player can collect hundreds of dragons and build a dragon army to destroy enemy fortress while protecting his/her fortress with towers such as ballista, cannons, flak turrets, and archers.

Development
War Dragons was developed and published by San Francisco-based company Pocket Gems. It was in developed for two years, based on their proprietary game engine the Mantis Engine.

Reception
Nadia Oxford for Gamezebo gave the game a positive review.

Novelization
In December 2015, Pocket Gems announced a novelization to their game, saying it was the "first-ever literary adaptation of a mobile game." The novel, "War Dragons: Every War Ends In Fire", was written by Brian Oliu.

References

External links
 

2015 video games
Android (operating system) games
Video games about dragons
iOS games
Real-time strategy video games
Video games developed in the United States